Dissenter's Chapel can mean:

 In the United Kingdom, a non-Anglican chapel, addressed by the Dissenters' Chapels Act 1844
 the best known of which is the Dissenters' Chapel, Kensal Green